The NASA helicopter Ingenuity on Mars made the first powered controlled flights by an aircraft on a planet other than Earth. Its first flight was April 19, 2021, after landing February 18 attached to the underside of the Perseverance rover. It is powered by six lithium-ion solar-charged batteries. It was built and is operated by the Jet Propulsion Laboratory (JPL), a field center of NASA. It was designed for a 30-day demonstration period, but has operated far above expectations, making its 47th flight on March 9, 2023,  days after its first flight.

List of flights

Data sources:

"m20 heli waypoints" NASA

Flight totals

Flight records

Flight path

See also 
 
 Atmosphere of Mars 
 Dragonfly – Robotic rotorcraft mission to Saturn's moon Titan, planned launch in 2027
 Exploration of Mars
 List of artificial objects on Mars
 List of firsts in aviation

Notes

References

Citations

Status reports

External links 
 Mars Helicopter Technology Demonstrator. (PDF) – The key design features of the prototype drone.
 
 Perseverance route map — including the flight tracks of Ingenuity
 Explore Mars

2020 in the United States
2020 robots
Aircraft with counter-rotating propellers
Coaxial rotor helicopters
Electric helicopters
Extraterrestrial aircraft
Individual space vehicles

Missions to Mars
NASA aircraft
NASA space probes
Space probes launched in 2020
Unmanned helicopters
2021 on Mars